Jaffna Lagoon is a large lagoon off Jaffna District and Kilinochchi District, northern Sri Lanka. The lagoon is surrounded by the densely populated Jaffna Peninsula containing palmyra palms, coconut plantations, and rice paddies. There are numerous fishing villages and some salt pans. The lagoon has extensive mudflats, seagrass beds and some mangroves. The lagoon attracts a wide variety of water birds including American flamingoes, ducks, gulls, terns and other shorebirds.

Jaffna Lagoon
Jaffna Lagoon is a shallow coastal stretch of water between the Jaffna and the Kilinochchi Districts in northern Sri Lanka. It is located between the longitudes of 79°54E and 80°20E, and the latitudes of 9°30N and 9°50N, and connected to Palk Bay through a channel to the west. It is connected to two internal lagoons, Vadamarachchi Lagoon and Uppu Aru Lagoon, and the external Chundikkulam Lagoon (sometimes known as Elephants Pass Lagoon). The lagoons receive fresh water from their catchment areas, contain brackish or saline water and are connected to the sea; sandbanks sometimes form across the channels connecting them to the sea and at other times, these are washed away.

The shores of the lagoon are largely sand, shingle and mud, with many small creeks. There are some mudflats, saltmarshes and areas of scrubby mangrove. The area round the lagoon is marshland bordered by thick jungle with dense undergrowth. There are disused saltpans and marshy scrubland, as well as coconut plantations and fishing camps, but little human occupation. This is because this area of the Jaffna Peninsula saw much strife during the struggles of the Tamil Tigers for an independent state in the late twentieth century, and much of the civilian population left the area. Both sides in the conflict planted land mines, including in the shallow waters of the lagoons. Most of the land mines have now been cleared, bringing the possibility of introducing increased eco-type tourism.

Flora and fauna
There are extensive areas of seagrass meadows, with shrimps and various species of fish. Plants growing on the shore include the coconut palm, doub palm, Ipomoea pes-caprae, and Calotropis gigantea, Azadirachta indica, Cynodon dactylon and Argemone mexicana.

The lagoon is visited by large numbers of migratory water birds during the winter. These include the northern pintail, the Eurasian wigeon, the garganey, the black-tailed godwit, the Eurasian curlew, the Eurasian teal, and the northern shoveler. Other birds found here include gulls, terns and the American flamingo.

References

Bodies of water of Jaffna District
Bodies of water of Kilinochchi District
Lagoons of Sri Lanka